Yongdu Station is a station on the Seongsu Branch of the Seoul Subway Line 2. It is located in Yongdu-dong, Dongdaemun-gu, Seoul. The name of the station means "dragon head".

Neighborhoods
Dongdaemun-gu office
Cheonggyecheon

References

Metro stations in Dongdaemun District
Seoul Metropolitan Subway stations
Railway stations opened in 2005
2005 establishments in South Korea